Full Bloom is the debut solo album by Hisham Bharoocha, aka Soft Circle. It was released in January 2007 by Eastern Developments Music.

Track listing
"Ascend" – 3:01
"Moon Oar Sunrise" – 8:20
"Sundazed" – 7:06
"Stones and Trees" – 7:08
"Shimmer" – 7:01
"Whirl" – 7:02
"Earthed" – 7:09

2007 debut albums
Eastern Developments Music albums
Soft Circle albums